Broadley is a surname. Notable people with the surname include:

Alexander Meyrick Broadley (1847–1916), British historian, author, and barrister
Denise Broadley (1913–2007), British artist
Donald George Broadley (1932–2016), British herpetologist living in Zimbabwe
Eric Broadley (1928–2017), British entrepreneur, engineer, founder and former chief designer of Lola Cars
Henry Broadley (1793–1851), British Conservative politician who sat in the House of Commons from 1837 to 1851
Henry Harrison-Broadley (1853–1914), British Conservative politician who sat in the House of Commons from 1906 to 1914
Ian Rank-Broadley (born 1952), British sculptor and coin designer
Pascal Broadley (born 1972), English cricketer
William Harrison-Broadley (1820–1896), British Conservative politician who sat in the House of Commons from 1868 to 1885

See also
Broadley's dwarf gecko
Broadley's flat lizard
Broadley's ridged frog
Broadley railway station, which served Broadley in Rochdale, England, from 1870 until 1947